The 2020 Dakar Rally was the 42nd edition of the event and the first edition held in Saudi Arabia. The event started in Jeddah on 5 January and finished in Al-Qiddiya on 17 January after 12 stages of the competition.

This was also the first event under the direction of David Castera, who replaced Etienne Lavigne when he stepped down from the role in March 2019 after 15 years in charge.

Spaniard Carlos Sainz won his third Dakar with a third different make, his first with the new Mini JCW X-Raid buggy. In the motorcycle class, American Ricky Brabec became the first person from North America to win any class in the Dakar Rally. It was also the first victory for Honda since 1989 and ended a streak of 18 consecutive wins for KTM. In trucks, Russian Andrey Karginov took his second Dakar win, while Kamaz won their 17th as a manufacturer. Chilean rider Ignacio Casale won his third Dakar rally in the quad category after returning from his brief foray into the UTV class in 2019. American Casey Currie took victory in the UTV class, marking the first American victory there.

The rally was marred by the fatal accidents of Portuguese motorcyclist Paulo Gonçalves on stage 7 and Dutch motorcyclist Edwin Straver on stage 11.

Summary

Host country selection 
After 11 years in South America, the event was held in the Asian continent for the first time ever. Organisers admitted that there was "hesitation" before the decision to hold the event in a country which has been under fire over human rights abuses and its recent involvement in the war in Yemen.

The contract to host the event in Saudi Arabia has been signed for the next five years,
 
although it is rumoured that the agreement is actually for ten years.
 
The event had been looking for alternatives, as it is believed that the relationships between the A.S.O. and South American governments have degraded over the last few years for a variety of reasons, including the disqualification of Bolivian favourite Juan Carlos Salvatierra from the quad class in 2019.

The route 
The rally started from Jeddah, headed north along the Red Sea, passed through Red Sea Project towards ambitious city project Neom. The rally turn east, towards capital Riyadh. After the rest day the rally headed south to the Arabian Desert, across the dunes of the Empty Quarter, then south-east into the Eastern Province as far as Shubaytah, and then back north-west to finish in Qiddiya.

David Castera, director of the Dakar said "I'm already inspired and delighted to have to design a course in such a monumental geography, made for the most audacious itineraries. We are spoilt for choice. Sports, navigation, a will to surpass oneself: all these aspects will naturally be glorified on this territory made for rally-raids.”

The competitors 
Many well known rally drivers entered this edition, including 13-time winner Stephane Peterhansel, and previous year's winner Nasser Al-Attiyah. Former Formula One champion Fernando Alonso make a debut in the event in car category.

The official entry list consisted of 351 vehicles (vs 334 in 2019). The entry list consisted of 557 competitors, which represented 53 nationalities. Most dominant was French with 258 entries, followed by Spanish 77 and the Dutch 53. As the rally moved out of South America, the proportion of South American entrants had logically decreased, however it had still strong with 42 vehicle entries. The most significant increase was from host country Saudi Arabia - 18 (13 drivers/riders and 5 navigators). 65 competitors took part in Dakar rallies on four continents. The oldest contestant was 73 years old, while the youngest turned 18 during the event. There were 13 female contestants.

Changes in regulations 
Several new formats were introduced in this edition of the rally. The road books, which are now in color, on six stages were handed out 15 minutes prior to the start of the timed sector. The aim was reduce competitive advantage of the big teams and to rebalance the parameters in favour of the less professional entries. In order to eliminate cheating with technology only affordable by the largest teams, all unapproved competitor electronic devices needed to be locked in a sealed compartment during the race. Also, the organizers placed cameras inside top 19 participant vehicles to be able to review footage if suspicion arises.
 
On top of already traditional all vehicle marathon stage, a motorcycle "Super Marathon" stage was introduced, where only 10 minutes of work on the machines were allowed. Compulsory bike and quad 15 min. breaks while refueling were now extended to all vehicle categories. Competitors who were forced to retire will be permitted to re-join the rally in the “Dakar Experience” classification, similar to the "Rally 2" classification used in the World Rally Championship. 
This year all UTV's were homogenized into a single FIA T3 category for lightweight buggies (< 900 kg) with an engine size less than 1,000 cc. Fitted with restrictors, UTV's were sub-categorized into T3.S (production vehicles) limited to 120 km/h and T3.P (prototypes) limited to 130 km/h.

Entry lists

Last minute changes
French motorcycle rider Michael Metge has announced that he is withdrawing from entering the event due to knee injury. His brother Adrien Metge took his place.
 
Polish motorcycle rider Jackek Bartoszek also suffered a knee injury while training, and was not able to start.
 

Another Polish sportsman Sebastian Rozwadowski, co-driver to Benediktas Vanagas became ill with tropical virus while on holidays, and was forced to withdraw. Last year 11-th placed Benediktas Vanagas managed to reach agreement with Filipe Palmeiro as his replacement co-driver.
 
Filipe was to start the event as Boris Garafulic co-driver until Boris announced his withdrawal from 2020 rally due to political situation in Chile. 
 
Stéphane Peterhansel was due to start with his wife Andrea as co-driver, however, pre-race medical tests revealed a health concern, and Andrea withdrew. Stephane's new co-pilot became Paulo Fiúza, although they both lack fluency in English, their common language.
 

During the shakedown three days before the start Martin Kolomý crashed his Ford Raptor. In addition to injuring his back, the rollcage of his vehicle was damaged enough to rule him out of starting the rally.

In UTV category Cyril Despres got the last minute call-up to start in OT3 buggy with co-driver Mike Horn.
 
Artur Ardavichus could not resolve issues with his license in time and gave up his place in the team to fellow-Kazakh Denis Berezovskiy.

Number of entries

Note: The number in brackets includes participants in "Dakar Experience" class.

Vehicles and Categories

In 2020 event the major vehicle categories were motorbikes, quads, cars, UTV's and trucks. The vehicles are further divided into classes and subcategories in accordance to FIA homologation.

G1 - the "Elite" motorbike group. Defined by A.S.O. "Elite" riders have all finished in the Top 10 in the general classification or have at least won a special stage in the past few years. All motorbike classes have engine capacity limited to 450cc.

G2 - the "Non-Elite" motorbike group. This subcategory sometimes called the "Super Production". To participate, the rider must have already finished at least one round of the FIM Cross-Country World Cup or a "Dakar Series" race. Another subcategory is the "Marathon" sub-class, restrictions on which components may be changed during the race applies to competitors in this category.

G3 - the quad class. Quads are subdivided into the two-wheel drive quads with engine capacity limited to 750cc and the four-wheel drive quads with engine capacity limited to 900cc.

T1 - the most common Cars class, it is a prototype vehicle, built of a tubular frame, with fiberglass or carbon bodywork shell. They commonly have a "silhouette" of a production vehicle, but in reality only a few decorative parts in common, such as lights and grille. T1 is further subdivided into petrol/diesel and 2WD/4WD subcategories.

T2 - are production vehicles modified for competition in Cars class. The FIA regulations are very strict about what can and cannot be modified or up-rated. Typical modifications include roll cage, "bucket" seats with racing safety harness, competition fuel tanks.

T3 - are lightweight prototype vehicles, often equipped with motorcycle engines. Since 2017 the T3's are classified in a separate UTV (sometimes called SSV or SxS (side by side)) category. 

T4 - is the truck category. The production-based trucks that meet FIA regulations are in T4.1 subcategory. Not many compete in the Dakar Rally because they are not very suitable for crossing dunes. T4.2, the most common category is created by the Dakar Rally organizers. These are prototype trucks, with cab and certain components standard. There is also T4.3 "rapid assistance" vehicles. They are essentially mobile workshops on T4.1 or T4.2 base, built to carry parts and assist their teams vehicles in other categories. 

OPEN - includes vehicles meeting technical standards different from those of the FIA, such as the American SCORE regulation, electric vehicles or powered by alternative energy sources. Beginning with the 2019 Dakar Rally, UTV's that meet national regulations are also allowed under this category.

Note: T2.C category is T2 production vehicles with obsolete FIA approval

Bikes

  The "Dakar Legends" - competitors that participated in 10 or more Dakar events - are marked in yellow.  The first time starters - "rookies" - are marked in blue.  In orange are marked the competitors participating in "Original by Motul" - limited assistance marathon class.

Quads

  The "Dakar Legends" - competitors that participated in 10 or more Dakar events - are marked in yellow.  The first time starters - "rookies" - are marked in blue.

Cars

  The "Dakar Legends" - competitors that participated in 10 or more Dakar events - are marked in yellow.  The first time starters - "rookies" - are marked in blue.  Competitors that were not able to start the race.

UTVs

  The "Dakar Legends" - competitors that participated in 10 or more Dakar events - are marked in yellow.  The first time starters - "rookies" - are marked in blue.

Trucks

  The "Dakar Legends" - competitors that participated in 10 or more Dakar events - are marked in yellow.  The first time starters - "rookies" - are marked in blue.

Stages
Stage 8 was cancelled for motorbikes and quads, following the death of Paulo Gonçalves on stage 7.

Stage results

Bikes
Stage 8 was canceled for motorbikes and quads following Paulo Gonçalves death.

Quads

Cars

UTVs

Trucks

Final standings

Bikes

Quads

Cars

UTVs

Trucks

Original by Motul
The “Original by Motul” category, refers to bikes and quads competitors competing without any kind of assistance. The organizers provide 1 trunk per competitor for storage of the personal belongings, spare parts and tools. Competitors are only allowed to bring 1 headlight, 1 set of wheels, 1 set of tyres, 1 tent with sleeping bag and mattress, 1 travel bag and 1x 25L backpack. Organizers allow free use of the generators, compressors and tool-boxes in the bivouac. 38 competitors started the race in this category, and 27 reached the finish.

Top 10

Fatalities
On 12 January 2020, Portuguese motorcycle rider Paulo Gonçalves suffered a crash 276 kilometres into Stage 7 and went into cardiac arrest following severe trauma to the head, neck and backbone. Several riders stopped in an attempt to aid Gonçalves before paramedics arrived, but Gonçalves was declared dead upon arrival at the hospital. It was the 13th Dakar event for Paulo. Following the accident, Stage 8 was cancelled for the bike and quad classes. Hero Motorsports Team Rally, for whom Gonçalves had been riding, elected to withdraw its remaining entries following the crash.

On 16 January 2020 during the 11th stage, Dutch KTM rider Edwin Straver crashed his motorcycle and suffered a fractured cervical vertebra. Initial reports indicated that he had no heartbeat for 10 minutes before being resuscitated and transported to hospital in Riyadh. Straver was listed in critical condition and remained in a coma for several days before being transported back to the Netherlands. After receiving diagnosis of significant brain damage from the crash, Straver's family elected to cease assisted respiration, and Straver died on January 24, 2020.

See also
 Dakar Rally
 List of Dakar Rally records
 List of Dakar Rally competitors
 List of Dakar Rally fatal accidents
 A.S.O.

References

Dakar Rally
Dakar
Dakar
Dakar Rally
Dakar Rally